Linea is a genus of foraminifera belonging to the subfamily Rhabdammininae. It is a monotypic genus containing the sole species Linea simplex.

Morphology
Linea simplex has an overall string-like appearance, with a thin unbranching test in the shape of a flexible tube with a consistent diameter of around 80 μm. The tube is several centimeters long, irregularly filled by dark material, presumably stercomata.

It is morphologically similar to Dendrophrya except it is unbranched. It also has similarities with Bathysiphon but is smaller in diameter and has a much thinner wall section.

Taxonomy
The genus and species were described in 1989 by C. J. Schröder, F. S. Medioli and D. B. Scott. The origin of the genus name comes from the latin noun "linea", meaning string, due to the string-like appearance of the organism. The species epithet comes from the latin adjective "simplex", meaning plain, simple.

References

Monothalamea